Marney Ann White is an American psychologist and epidemiologist.

Early life and education
White completed her Bachelor of Science degree in 1991 from the University of Virginia and her Master's degree at James Madison University. She obtained her doctoral degree at Louisiana State University and published Development and validation of the food-craving inventory. Following her clinical internship, she completed a postdoctoral fellowship in the Department of Psychiatry at the Yale School of Medicine. She then completed a second master's degree at Yale School of Public Health in Chronic Disease Epidemiology.

Career
Upon completing her postdoctoral fellowship, White joined the faculty at the Yale University School of Medicine as an assistant professor. During the 2013–14 academic year, White was promoted to the rank of associate professor and was selected as Teacher of the Year by Yale School of Public Health Class of 2014 and 2020.  She was promoted to the rank of professor in 2021.

As an associate professor, White co-authored Stress, cortisol, and other appetite‐related hormones: Prospective prediction of 6‐month changes in food cravings and weight. She was also the first author on Evaluation of a Behavioral Self-Care Intervention for Public Health Students which examined the effectiveness of a behavioral health promotion intervention on health behaviors of postgraduate students.

During the COVID-19 pandemic, White integrated COVID-19 into her undergraduate course: Introduction to Epidemiology and Public Health. She created a case study in which she asked students to compare COVID-19 to SARS and walked them through basic epidemiological procedures. She also created a socially distanced learning course on self-care for the public to cope with the anxiety of COVID-19. White has also published various op-eds on COVID anxiety, mental health, and returning to work and authored COVID-19: When Teaching Public Health Became Personal. In 2021, White was ranked the world's third top expert in binge-eating disorder by Expertscape's PubMed-based algorithms, alongside colleagues Carlos Grilo, Robin Masheb, Marc Potenza, Janet Lydecker, and Valentina Ivezaj.

Personal life
White and her husband Erik Mayville have one son together and two stepdaughters.

References

External links

Living people
American women psychologists
Scientists from Virginia
Yale University faculty
Yale School of Medicine alumni
University of Virginia alumni
Louisiana State University alumni
American women epidemiologists
American epidemiologists
Year of birth missing (living people)
21st-century American women